The drug combination prednisolone/promethazine is an antidote for snake bites.

References

Further reading 

 

Antidotes
Combination drugs